The Escuela Japonesa de Panamá ("Panama Japanese School"; パナマ日本人学校 Panama Nihonjin Gakkō) is a Japanese international school in the Marbella area, Bella Vista (ES), Panama City. It was established on October 12, 1974 (Shōwa 49).

References

Further reading

 山崎 尚史. "海外あちらこちら パナマ日本人学校での国際交流学習." 教育じほう (595), 83-85, 1997-08. 東京都新教育研究会. See profile at CiNii.
 太田 昭. "日本人学校の実践--パナマ日本人学校 (海外子女教育の課題--進展する国際化の中で<特集>) -- (事例紹介)." The Monthly Journal of Mombusho (文部時報) (1305), p48-51, 1986-01. ぎょうせい. See profile at CiNii.
 西村憲人 (前パナマ日本人学校 教諭; 大阪府大阪市立小松小学校 教諭) "パナマ日本人学校における少人数指導の工夫と実践" (Archive). Tokyo Gakugei University.

External links

  Escuela Japonesa de Panamá
  Escuela Japonesa de Panamá
  Escuela Japonesa de Panamá (Archive)
  "【7月】パナマ日本人学校 コスタリカ・サンホセ日本人学校との第一回の交流 ." Panasonic Education Foundation 

Japanese
Panama
1974 establishments in Panama
Educational institutions established in 1974
Panama City